Cercospora pisa-sativae is a fungal plant pathogen.

References

External links

pisa-sativae
Fungal plant pathogens and diseases